Lewis Brian Hopkin Jones (28 February 1942 – 3 July 1969) was an English multi-instrumentalist and singer best known as the founder, rhythm/lead guitarist, and original leader of the Rolling Stones. Initially a guitarist, he went on to provide backing vocals and played a wide variety of instruments on Rolling Stones recordings and in concerts.

After he founded the Rolling Stones as a British blues outfit in 1962, and gave the band its name, Jones' fellow band members Keith Richards and Mick Jagger began to take over the band's musical direction, especially after they became a successful songwriting team. Jones and fellow guitarist Richards also developed a unique style of guitar play that Richards refers to as the "ancient art of weaving" in which both players would play rhythm and lead parts together, which became a Rolling Stones trademark. Jones, however, did not get along with the band's manager, Andrew Loog Oldham, who pushed the band into a musical direction at odds with Jones' blues background, and with whom he got into many fights.

When Jones developed alcohol and drug problems, his performance in the studio became increasingly unreliable, leading to a diminished role within the band he had founded. In June 1969, the Rolling Stones dismissed Jones; guitarist Mick Taylor took his place in the group. Less than a month later, Jones died by drowning in the swimming pool at his home at Cotchford Farm, East Sussex. His death was referenced in songs by many other pop bands, and Pete Townshend and Jim Morrison wrote poems about it. In 1989, he was inducted into the Rock and Roll Hall of Fame as a member of the Rolling Stones.

Biography

Early life
Brian Lewis Hopkin Jones was born in the Park Nursing Home in Cheltenham, Gloucestershire, on Saturday, 28 February 1942. An attack of croup at the age of four left Jones with asthma that lasted for the rest of his life. His middle-class parents, Lewis Blount Jones and Louisa Beatrice Jones (née Simmonds), were of Welsh descent. Brian had two sisters; Pamela, who was born on 3 October 1944 and died on 14 October 1945 of leukaemia; and Barbara, born on 22 August 1946.

Jones attended local schools, including Dean Close School from September 1949 to July 1953; and Cheltenham Grammar School for Boys, (now Pate's Grammar School) which he entered in September 1953 after passing the eleven-plus exam. He enjoyed badminton and diving at school, and became first clarinet in the school orchestra. Jones reportedly obtained seven O-level passes in 1957, thence continuing into the sixth form and obtaining a further two O-levels. He passed A-levels in physics and chemistry, but failed biology.

Jones was able to perform well in exams despite a lack of academic effort. However, he found school regimented, and disliked school uniforms and conformism in general; Jones himself said: "When I made the sixth form I found myself accepted by the older boys; suddenly I was in". His hostility to authority figures resulted in his suspension from school on two occasions. According to Dick Hattrell, a childhood friend: "He was a rebel without a cause, but when examinations came he was brilliant".

Both Jones' parents were interested in music; his father was a piano teacher in addition to his job as an aeronautical engineer, and his mother played piano and organ and led the choir at the local church. Jones listened to classical music as a child but preferred blues, particularly Elmore James and Robert Johnson. In 1957 he first heard Cannonball Adderley's music and took an interest in jazz. Jones persuaded his parents to buy him a saxophone and two years later his parents gave him his first acoustic guitar as a 17th-birthday present. Jones began performing at local blues and jazz clubs, while busking and working odd jobs. He reportedly stole small amounts of money from work to pay for cigarettes, for which he was fired.

Relationships and fatherhood 
In late summer 1958, when both were aged 16, Jones' girlfriend, a Cheltenham schoolgirl named Valerie Corbett, became pregnant. Although Jones is said to have encouraged her to have an abortion, she carried the child to term and placed the baby for adoption. Jones quit school in disgrace and left home, travelling for a summer through northern Europe. During this period, he lived a bohemian lifestyle, busking with his guitar on the streets for money and living off the charity of others. Eventually, he ran short of money and returned to England.

In November 1959, Jones went to the Wooden Bridge Hotel in Guildford to see a band perform. He met a young married woman named Angeline, and the two had a one-night stand that resulted in her pregnancy. Angeline and her husband decided to raise the baby, Belinda, born on 4 August 1960. Jones never knew about the pregnancy or her birth.

In 1962, Jones applied for a scholarship to Cheltenham Art College. He was initially accepted into the programme, but two days later the offer was withdrawn after an unidentified acquaintance wrote to the college, calling Jones an irresponsible drifter. Later that year, on 22 October, Jones' girlfriend Pat Andrews gave birth to his third child, Julian Mark Andrews. Jones moved in with them and sold his record collection to buy flowers for Andrews and clothes for the newborn.

In a television interview in 1965, Andrews stated that in the early days of their relationship, although she and Jones were both working, his interest in the guitar meant he didn't have much money for buying food or anything beyond paying the rent. According to Andrews, Jones was initially proud of Julian Mark (called Mark), but when the Rolling Stones acquired a manager, Brian was instructed not to be seen with either mother or child. Jones, she said, agreed, telling her she'd have to "put up with it for a few months" until the band had had some success. However, once the Stones did become successful, she noted Jones "just seemed to drift away", becoming more interested in famous people he met, and that she "never received a penny from Brian at all". In the same interview, Pat also noted she felt sorry for Brian as "he just uses people".

In early 1963, Jones began a relationship with Linda Lawrence. On 23 July 1964, Lawrence gave birth to Jones' fourth child, Julian Brian Lawrence. Lawrence later married Scottish folk/pop singer Donovan. They raised Julian together, changing his name to Julian Leitch. Two years later, while on tour, Jones met Italian-German model and actress Anita Pallenberg backstage and began a significant relationship with her. Jones became extremely abusive, at one point breaking his hand on Pallenberg's face. In 1967, Pallenberg left Jones for his bandmate Keith Richards, which added to tensions between Brian and Keith.

Brian had subsequent relationships with English model Suki Potier and Swedish model Anna Wohlin, as well as a short relationship in 1968 with American model  Donyale Luna, who appeared with him in the concert film The Rolling Stones Rock and Roll Circus several months before his death. Wohlin was living with Jones in 1969 when he died, and has written two books about her time with him.

Paternity cover-up 
In early October 1964, Jones'  occasional girlfriend, Dawn Molloy, announced to Jones and the Rolling Stones' management that she was pregnant by him. She received a cheque for £700 from group manager Andrew Loog Oldham. In return, she signed an agreement that the matter was now closed and that she would make no statement about Jones or the child to the public or the press. The undated statement was signed by Molloy and witnessed by Mick Jagger.

Forming the Rolling Stones

Jones left Cheltenham and moved to London, where he became friends with fellow musicians Alexis Korner, future Manfred Mann singer Paul Jones, future Cream bassist Jack Bruce, and others who made up the small London rhythm and blues and jazz scene. He became a blues musician, for a brief time calling himself "Elmo Lewis" and playing slide guitar. He also started a group with Paul Jones called the Roosters. In January 1963, after both Jones and Paul left the group, Eric Clapton took over Brian's position as guitarist.

Jones placed an advertisement in the 2 May 1962 edition of Jazz News, a Soho club information sheet, inviting musicians to audition for a new R&B group at the Bricklayer's Arms pub; pianist Ian Stewart was the first to respond. Later, singer Mick Jagger also joined this band; Jagger and his childhood friend Keith Richards had met Jones when he and Paul were playing Elmore James' "Dust My Broom" with Korner's band at the Ealing Jazz Club. Jagger brought guitarist Richards to rehearsals; Richards then joined the band. Jones' and Stewart's acceptance of Richards and the Chuck Berry songs he wanted to play coincided with the departure of blues purists guitarist Geoff Bradford and singer Brian Knight, who had no tolerance for Chuck Berry.

As Richards tells it, Jones came up with the name the "Rollin' Stones" (later with the 'g') while on the phone with a venue owner. "The voice on the other end of the line obviously said, 'What are you called?' Panic! The Best of Muddy Waters album was lying on the floor—and track five, side one was 'Rollin' Stone Blues'". The Rollin' Stones played their first gig on 12 July 1962 at the Marquee Club in London, with a line-up of Jagger, Richards, Jones, Stewart, bass player Dick Taylor (later of the Pretty Things) and drummer Tony Chapman.

From September 1962 to September 1963, Jones, Jagger and Richards shared a flat (referred to by Richards as "a beautiful dump") at 102 Edith Grove, Chelsea, with James Phelge, a future photographer whose name was used in some of the group's early "Nanker/Phelge" writing credits. Jones and Richards spent day after day playing guitar while listening to blues records (notably Jimmy Reed, Muddy Waters, Willie Dixon and Howlin' Wolf). During this time, Jones also taught Jagger how to play harmonica.

The four Stones went searching for a bassist and drummer, finally settling on Bill Wyman on bass because he had a spare VOX AC30 guitar amplifier and always had cigarettes, as well as a bass guitar that he had built himself. After playing with Mick Avory, Tony Chapman and Carlo Little, in January 1963 they finally persuaded jazz-influenced Charlie Watts to join them. At the time, Watts was considered by fellow musicians to be one of the better drummers in London; he had played with (among others) Alexis Korner's group Blues Incorporated.

Watts described Jones' role in these early days: "Brian was very instrumental in pushing the band at the beginning. Keith and I would look at him and say he was barmy. It was a crusade to him to get us on the stage in a club and be paid half-a-crown and to be billed as an R&B band".

While acting as the band's business manager, Jones received £5 more than the other members, which did not sit well with the rest of the band and created resentment. Richards has said that both he and Jagger were surprised to learn that Jones considered himself the leader and was receiving the extra £5, especially as other people, like Giorgio Gomelsky, appeared to be doing the booking.

Musical contributions

Jones was a gifted multi-instrumentalist, proficient on a wide variety of musical instruments. Prior to his dismissal from the Stones in 1969, Jones typically played all their instruments that varied from the drums, guitars, piano, and bass that were standard in rock. His ability to play a wide variety of instruments is most evident on the albums Aftermath (1966), Between the Buttons (1967) and Their Satanic Majesties Request (1967). As a guitarist, in the early days he favoured a white teardrop-shaped electric guitar produced by the Vox company, especially in live performances; he also played a wide variety of electric and acoustic guitars from companies such as Rickenbacker, Gibson, and Fender. As a slide guitarist, he favoured the open E and open G tunings.

Examples of Jones' contributions are his slide guitar on "I Wanna Be Your Man" (1963), "I'm a King Bee", "Little Red Rooster" (1964), "I Can't Be Satisfied" (1964), "I'm Movin' On" (1965), "Mona" (1965), "Doncha Bother Me" and "No Expectations". Jones can also be heard playing Bo Diddley-style rhythm guitar on "I Need You Baby", "Please Go Home", "19th Nervous Breakdown", and the guitar riff in "The Last Time"; sitar on "Street Fighting Man" and "Paint It Black"; organ on "Let's Spend the Night Together"; marimba on "Under My Thumb", "Out of Time" and "Yesterday's Papers"; recorder on "Ruby Tuesday" and "All Sold Out"; saxophone on "Child of the Moon" and "Citadel"; kazoo on "Cool, Calm & Collected"; Appalachian dulcimer on "I Am Waiting" and "Lady Jane", Mellotron on "She's a Rainbow", "We Love You", "Stray Cat Blues", "2000 Light Years from Home", and "Citadel"; and the autoharp on "Ride On, Baby" and (for his final recording as a Rolling Stone) on "You Got the Silver". He also played the oboe/soprano sax solo in "Dandelion".

Jones also played harmonica on many of the Rolling Stones' early songs. Examples of Jones' playing are on "Come On", "Stoned" (1963), "Not Fade Away" (1964), "I Just Want to Make Love to You", "Now I've Got a Witness" (1964), "Good Times, Bad Times" (1964), "2120 South Michigan Avenue" (1964) (from the EP Five By Five), "The Under Assistant West Coast Promotion Man", "One More Try" (1965), "High and Dry" and "Goin' Home" (1966), "Who's Driving Your Plane?" (1966), "Cool, Calm & Collected", "Who's Been Sleeping Here" (1967), and "Dear Doctor" and "Prodigal Son" (1968).

In the early years, Jones often served as a backing vocalist. Notable examples are "Come On", "I Wanna Be Your Man", "Walking the Dog", "Bye Bye Johnny", "Money", "I'm Alright", "You Better Move On", "Poison Ivy", (I Can't Get No) Satisfaction, and "It's All Over Now". He contributed backing vocals as late as 1968 on "Sympathy for the Devil". He is also responsible for the whistling on "Walking the Dog".

Richards maintains that what he calls "guitar weaving" emerged from this period, from listening to Jimmy Reed albums: "We listened to the teamwork, trying to work out what was going on in those records; how you could play together with two guitars and make it sound like four or five". Jones' and Richards' guitars became a signature of the sound of the Rolling Stones, with both guitarists playing rhythm and lead without clear boundaries between the two roles (although Keith Richards would play most of the standard guitar solos while Brian played the slide guitar solos).

Estrangement from bandmates

Oldham's arrival as manager marked the beginning of Jones' slow estrangement. Oldham recognised the financial advantages of band members writing their own songs, as exemplified by Lennon–McCartney, and that playing covers would not sustain a band in the limelight for long. Further, he wanted to make Jagger's charisma and flamboyance a focus of live performances. Jones saw his influence over the Stones' direction wane as their repertoire comprised fewer of the blues covers than he preferred; more Jagger/Richards originals developed (although many still had a bluesy sound), and Oldham increased his own managerial control, displacing Jones from yet another role.

The toll from days on the road, the money and fame, and the feeling of being alienated from the group resulted in Jones' overindulgence in alcohol and other drugs. These excesses had a debilitative effect on his physical and mental health and, according to Oldham, Jones became unfriendly and antisocial at times.

In March 1967, Anita Pallenberg, Jones' girlfriend of two years, left him for Richards when Jones was hospitalised while the three were on a trip to Morocco, further damaging the already strained relations between Jones and Richards. As tensions and Jones' substance abuse increased, his musical contributions became sporadic. He became bored with the guitar and sought exotic instruments to play, and he was increasingly absent from recording sessions. In Peter Whitehead's promotional film for We Love You, made in July 1967, he appears extremely groggy and disorientated.

Jones was arrested for drug possession on 10 May 1967, shortly after the Redlands bust at Richards' Sussex home. Authorities found marijuana, cocaine, and methamphetamine in his flat. He confessed to marijuana use, but said he did not use hard drugs. In June 1967, he attended the Monterey Pop Festival. There he met Dennis Hopper, and went on stage to introduce the Jimi Hendrix Experience who were not yet well known in the United States.

Hostility grew between Jones, Jagger, and Richards, alienating Jones further from the group. Although many noted that Jones could be friendly and outgoing, Wyman, Richards, and Watts have commented that he could also be cruel and difficult. By most accounts, Jones' attitude changed frequently; he was one minute caring and generous, the next making an effort to anger everyone. As Wyman observed in Stone Alone: "There were at least two sides to Brian's personality. One Brian was introverted, shy, sensitive, deep-thinking. The other was a preening peacock, gregarious, artistic, desperately needing assurance from his peers." Wyman added: "He pushed every friendship to the limit and way beyond".

Jones' last substantial sessions with the Stones occurred in spring and summer of 1968, when the Stones produced "Jumpin' Jack Flash" and the Beggars Banquet album. He can be seen in the Jean-Luc Godard film One Plus One playing acoustic guitar and chatting and sharing cigarettes with Richards, although Jones is neglected in the music-making. The film chronicles the making of "Sympathy for the Devil".

Where once Jones played multiple instruments on many tracks, he now played only minor roles on a few pieces. Jones' last formal appearance was in the December 1968 The Rolling Stones Rock and Roll Circus, a part-concert, part circus-act film organised by the band. It went unreleased for more than 25 years because Jagger was unhappy with the band's performance compared to others in the film such as Jethro Tull, John Lennon, the Who, and Taj Mahal. Commentary included as bonus material indicated that almost everyone at the concert sensed that Jones' time with the Rolling Stones was nearing an end, and Roger Daltrey and Pete Townshend of the Who thought it would be Jones' last live musical performance.

Legal issues and departure from the Rolling Stones

Jones was arrested a second time on 21 May 1968, for possession of cannabis, which he said had been left by previous tenants of the flat. Because he was on probation at the time, he faced a long jail sentence if found guilty. The jury found him guilty, but the judge had sympathy for Jones; instead of jailing him, he fined him £50 plus £105 in costs and told him: "For goodness sake, don't get into trouble again or it really will be serious".

Jones' legal troubles, estrangement from his bandmates, substance abuse, and mood swings became too much of an obstacle to his active participation in the band. The Rolling Stones wanted to tour the United States in 1969, for the first time in three years, but Jones was not in a fit condition to tour, and his second arrest exacerbated problems with acquiring a US work visa. In addition, Jones' attendance at rehearsals and recording sessions had become erratic. When he did appear he either rarely contributed anything musically or, when he did, his bandmates would switch off his amplifier, leaving Richards to play nearly all the guitars. According to author Gary Herman, Jones was "literally incapable of making music; when he tried to play harmonica his mouth started bleeding".

This behaviour was problematic during the Their Satanic Majesties Request and Beggar's Banquet sessions and had worsened by the time the band commenced recording Let It Bleed. In March 1969, Jones borrowed the group's Jaguar and went shopping in Pimlico Road. After the parked car was towed away by police, Jones hired a chauffeur-driven car to get home. In May 1969, Jones crashed his motorcycle into a shop window and was secretly taken to hospital under an assumed name. From this point, he was still attending recording sessions but was no longer a major contributor to the band's music. By May, he had made two contributions to the work in progress: autoharp on "You Got the Silver" and percussion on "Midnight Rambler". Jagger informed Jones that he would be fired from the band if he did not turn up to a photo session. Looking frail, he nonetheless showed up and his last photo session as a Rolling Stone took place on 21 May 1969, first at St. Katherine Docks, Tower Bridge, London, and then at Ethan Russell's photographic studio in South Kensington. The photos would appear on the album Through the Past, Darkly (Big Hits Vol. 2) in September 1969.

The Stones decided that following the release of the Let it Bleed album (scheduled for July 1969 in the US) they would start a tour of North America in November 1969. However, the Stones' management was informed that Jones would not receive a work permit, owing to his drug convictions. At the suggestion of Stewart, the Stones decided to add a new guitarist. On 8 June 1969, Jones was visited by Jagger, Richards and Watts, and was told that the group he had formed would continue without him.

To the public it appeared as if Jones had left voluntarily; the other band members told him that although he was being dismissed, it was his choice how to break it to the public. Jones released a statement on 9 June 1969, announcing his departure. In this statement he said, among other things, that, "I no longer see eye-to-eye with the others over the discs we are cutting". He was replaced by the 20-year-old guitarist Mick Taylor, formerly of John Mayall's Bluesbreakers.

During the period of his decreasing involvement in the band, Jones was living at Cotchford Farm in East Sussex, the residence formerly owned by Winnie-the-Pooh author A. A. Milne, which Jones had purchased in November 1968. Alexis Korner, who visited in late June, noted that Jones seemed "happier than he had ever been". Jones is known to have contacted Korner, Stewart, John Lennon, Mitch Mitchell, Alan Price, and Jimmy Miller about intentions to put together another band. Jones had apparently demoed a few of his own songs in the weeks before his death, including "Has Anybody Seen My Baby?" and "Chow Time".

Death

At around midnight on the night of 2–3 July 1969, Jones was discovered motionless at the bottom of his swimming pool at Cotchford Farm. His Swedish girlfriend, Anna Wohlin, was convinced he was alive when he was taken out of the pool, insisting he still had a pulse. However, by the time the doctors arrived, it was too late, and he was pronounced dead on arrival at the hospital at the age of 27. The coroner's report stated it was a drowning, later clarified as "death by misadventure", and noted his liver and heart were greatly enlarged by past drug and alcohol abuse.

Upon Jones' death, the Who's Pete Townshend wrote a poem titled "A Normal Day for Brian, A Man Who Died Every Day" (printed in The Times), Jimi Hendrix dedicated a song to him on US television, and Jim Morrison of the Doors published a poem titled "Ode to L.A. While Thinking of Brian Jones, Deceased". Coincidentally, Hendrix and Morrison both died within the following two years, with Morrison's death falling on the same date as Jones's. All three died at the age of 27.

The Rolling Stones performed at a free concert in Hyde Park on 5 July 1969, two days after Jones' death. The band decided to dedicate the concert (which had been scheduled weeks earlier as an opportunity to present their new guitarist, Mick Taylor) to Jones. Before the Stones' set, Jagger read excerpts from "Adonais", a poem by Percy Bysshe Shelley about the death of his friend John Keats, and stagehands released hundreds of white butterflies as part of the tribute. The band opened with a Johnny Winter song that was one of Jones' favourites, "I'm Yours and I'm Hers" with Mick Taylor on the slide guitar.

His body was embalmed, with hair bleached white, and was placed in an air-tight silver and bronze casket. Watts and Wyman were the only Rolling Stones who attended the funeral. Mick Jagger and Marianne Faithfull were travelling to Australia to begin the filming of Ned Kelly; they stated that their contracts did not allow them to delay the trip to attend the funeral.

When asked if he felt guilty about Jones's death, Mick Jagger told Rolling Stone in 1995: "No, I don't really. I do feel that I behaved in a very childish way, but we were very young, and in some ways we picked on him. But, unfortunately, he made himself a target for it; he was very, very jealous, very difficult, very manipulative, and if you do that in this kind of a group of people you get back as good as you give, to be honest. I wasn't understanding enough about his drug addiction. No one seemed to know much about drug addiction. Things like LSD were all new. No one knew the harm. People thought cocaine was good for you."

Wyman said of Jones, "As the years go by, I become even more convinced that he's entitled to a free pardon. Brian Jones is a legend and his legacy is there for all to hear. While the Rolling Stones damaged all of us in some way, Brian was the only one that died."

Murder theory
Theories surrounding Jones's death developed soon afterwards, with associates of the Stones claiming to have information that he was murdered. According to rock biographer Philip Norman, "the murder theory would bubble back to the surface every five years or so". In 1993, it was reported that Jones was murdered by Frank Thorogood, a builder who was doing construction work on the property. He was the last person to see Jones alive. Thorogood allegedly confessed the murder to the Rolling Stones' driver Tom Keylock, who later denied this. The Thorogood theory was dramatised in the 2005 film Stoned. Thorogood is alleged to have killed Jones in a fight over money; he had been paid £18,000 for work on Cotchford Farm but he wanted another £6,000 from the musician. The killing is alleged to have been covered up by senior police officers when they discovered how badly the investigation into Jones' death had been botched by the local police.

In August 2009, Sussex Police decided to conduct a case review of Jones' death for the first time since 1969 after new evidence was handed to them by Scott Jones, an investigative journalist, who had traced many of the people who were at Brian Jones' house the night he died. The journalist had also uncovered unseen police files held at the National Archives. In 2010, following the review, Sussex Police stated it would not be reopening the case. It asserted that "this has been thoroughly reviewed by Sussex Police's Crime Policy and Review Branch, but there is no new evidence to suggest that the coroner's original verdict of 'death by misadventure' was incorrect."

Songwriting credits
Unsure and insecure as a composer, Jones was not a prolific songwriter. The 30-second "Rice Krispies" jingle for Kellogg's, co-written with the J. Walter Thompson advertising agency in 1963 and performed by The Rolling Stones incognito, was credited to Jones; this did not sit well with the rest of the band, who felt it was a group effort and all should benefit equally. Jones was also included in the "Nanker/Phelge" songwriting credit, a pseudonym used on fourteen tracks that were composed by the entire band and Andrew Oldham.

Oldham tried to establish a songwriting partnership between Jones and Gene Pitney after "becoming bored senseless by Jones's bleating about the potential of half-finished melodies that by no means deserved completion", but after two days of sessions "the results remain best to be unheard, even by Rolling Stones' completists". In 1995, Mick Jagger told Rolling Stone magazine that Jones had been jealous of the Jagger/Richards songwriting team, and added: "To be honest, Brian had no talent for writing songs. None. I've never known a guy with less talent for songwriting."

Faithfull reported that Jones wrote an early version of the melody for "Ruby Tuesday" and presented it to the group. Victor Bockris reported that Richards and Jones worked out the final melody in the studio. Additionally, Jones is credited (along with Richards) for the instrumental piece "Hear It". However, in 1966, Jones composed, produced, and played on the soundtrack to Mord und Totschlag (English title: A Degree Of Murder), an avant-garde German film with Anita Pallenberg, adding the majority of the instrumentation to the soundtrack.

The only known released Jones song is "(Thank You) For Being There", which is a poem by Jones put to music by Carla Olson (who ironically has collaborated with Jones's Rolling Stones successor, Mick Taylor). It appeared on the 1990 album True Voices as performed by Krysia Kristianne and Robin Williamson.

Other contributions

In summer 1968, Jones recorded the Morocco-based ensemble, the Master Musicians of Joujouka (Jajouka), which was later used by the band; the recording was released in 1971 as Brian Jones Presents the Pipes of Pan at Joujouka. Jagger and Richards visited Jajouka in 1989 after recording "Continental Drift" for the Rolling Stones album Steel Wheels with The Master Musicians of Jajouka led by Bachir Attar in Tangier. An homage to Jones entitled "Brian Jones Joujouka very Stoned", painted by Mohamed Hamri, who had brought Jones to Jajouka in 1967, appeared on the cover of Joujouka Black Eyes by the Master Musicians of Joujouka in 1995.

Brian Jones Presents the Pipes of Pan at Jajouka was rereleased in co-operation with Bachir Attar and Philip Glass in 1995. The executive producers were Jones, Glass, Kurt Munkacsi and Rory Johnston, with notes by Attar, Paul Bowles, William S. Burroughs, Stephen Davis, Brion Gysin and David Silver. and included additional graphics, more extensive notes by Silver and Burroughs, and a second CD, produced by Cliff Mark, with two "full-length remixes". In 1967
Jones played alto saxophone on the Beatles song "You Know My Name (Look Up The Number)", which was released in March 1970, eight months after his death. Jones also played percussion on the Jimi Hendrix song "All Along the Watchtower": "that's him playing the thwack you hear at the end of each bar in the intro, on an instrument called a vibraslap."

Equipment
Jones' main guitar in the early years was a Harmony Stratotone, which he replaced with a Gretsch Double Anniversary in two-tone green. In 1964 and 1965, he often used a teardrop-shaped prototype Vox Mark III. From late 1965 until his death, Jones used Gibson models (various Firebirds, Hummingbirds, an ES-330, a J-200 and a Gibson Les Paul Goldtop) as well as two Rickenbacker 12-string models. He can also be seen playing a Gibson Les Paul Goldtop with P-90 pickups in the 1968 "Jumpin' Jack Flash" promo video. Jones used various different Vox and Fender amplifiers for use in recording sessions in the studio and live performances throughout the 1960s.

Public image and legacy

Jones's musicianship, especially in the early days of the Rolling Stones, added much to the singles that propelled the band into the pop charts; it was his fashion sense and his hairstyle, that appealed to both men and women, that were copied by bands on both sides of the Atlantic.

Pallenberg has stated in an interview that Jones wanted to look like Françoise Hardy, loved "dressing up and posing about" and that he would ask her to do his hair and make-up. Bo Diddley described Jones as "a little dude that was trying to pull the group ahead. I saw him as the leader. He didn't take no mess. He was a fantastic cat; he handled the group beautifully."

Jones' death at 27 was the first of the 1960s rock phenomenon, and was followed within two years by the drug-related deaths of Jimi Hendrix, Jim Morrison, Alan Wilson and Janis Joplin, all at the same age. The coincidence of their deaths at the same age has been referred to in popular culture as the "27 Club".

When Alastair Johns, who owned Cotchford Farm for over 40 years after Jones' death, refurbished the pool, he sold the original tiles to Jones' fans for £100 each, which paid for half of the work. Johns noted that Cotchford Farm remained for decades an attraction for Jones' fans.

The Psychic TV song "Godstar" is about Jones' death, as are Robyn Hitchcock's "Trash", The Drovers' "She's as Pretty as Brian Jones Was", Jeff Dahl's "Mick and Keith killed Brian", Ted Nugent's "Death by Misadventure", and Salmonblaster's "Brian Jones". Toy Love's song "Swimming Pool" lists several dead rock icons including Jones (the others are Morrison, Hendrix, and Marc Bolan) just as A House's "Endless Art" does; Jones is also mentioned in De Phazz's song "Something Special". The Master Musicians of Joujouka song "Brian Jones Joujouka Very Stoned" was released in 1974 and 1996. The band Tigers Jaw heavily references Jones and his death in their song "I Saw Water", and pop punk band Groovie Ghoulies released the song "Planet Brian Jones" on a 7" vinyl EP of the same name in 1997. Alvin Youngblood Hart's song "Watchin' Brian Jones" appeared on his 2014 single release Helluva Way (For A Man To Make a Livin'). English group Ultimate Painting recorded "Song For Brian Jones" for their 2016 album Dusk.

Many of Jones' contemporaries admit to idolising him as young musicians, including Noel Redding, who, according to Pamela Des Barres' book I'm With the Band, contemplated suicide after hearing about his death. The Brian Jonestown Massacre, an American psychedelic rock band, take their name partly from Jones and are heavily influenced by his work.

The 2005 film Stoned is an account of Jones and his role in the Rolling Stones. The part of Brian was played by English actor Leo Gregory. A fictionalised version of Jones and the tribute concert to him appears in Alan Moore and Kevin O'Neill's The League of Extraordinary Gentlemen, Volume III: Century in its second issue, "Paint it Black". The world of The League of Extraordinary Gentlemen is an alternate universe version of Earth where several works of fiction are real with the fictional characters frequently  interacting with each other, with these characters occasionally serving as analogues of historical figures. Jones's fictional stand-in is Basil Fotherington-Tomas from the Nigel Molesworth books (who is now an adult, having grown up since the events in those books, and changed his name to "Basil Thomas") and his band is called "The Purple Orchestra". His musicianship and contribution to the band are featured heavily in the documentary Crossfire Hurricane. Another documentary, Rolling Stone: Life and Death of Brian Jones, directed by Danny Garcia and distributed by Dudeski and Chip Baker Films, was released in 2020.

Discography
With The Rolling Stones
 The Rolling Stones / England's Newest Hit Makers (1964)
 12 X 5 (1964)
 The Rolling Stones No. 2 / The Rolling Stones, Now! (1965)
 Out of Our Heads (1965)
 December's Children (And Everybody's) (1965)
 Aftermath (1966)
 Between the Buttons (1967)
 Their Satanic Majesties Request (1967)
 Beggars Banquet (1968)
 Let It Bleed (1969)

With The Beatles
 "Yellow Submarine" (1966) backing vocals, sound effects
 "You Know My Name (Look Up the Number)" (1970, recorded 1967) saxophone

With Jimi Hendrix
 "All Along the Watchtower" (1968) percussion
 "My Little One" (2011, recorded in 1967) sitar, percussion
 "Ain't Nothin' Wrong With That" (2011, recorded in 1967) sitar, percussion

With Peter and Gordon
 "A Mess of Blues" (1964) harmonica
 "You've Had Better Times" (1968) drums

With McGough and McGear
 "Basement Flat" (1968) saxophone
 "Summer with Monica" (1968) saxophone

With Marianne Faithfull
 "Is This What I Get For Loving You?" (1966) euphonium

With The Andrew Oldham Orchestra
 "365 Rolling Stones" (1964) lead vocals, handclaps

With Hapshash and the Coloured Coat
 "Western Flier" (1969) piano, guitar, harmonica

Solo discography
 A Degree of Murder (1967) (soundtrack)
 Brian Jones Presents the Pipes of Pan at Joujouka (1971) (recorded 1968)

References

Cited sources

Further reading
 Gered Mankowitz, Brian Jones: Like a Rollin' Stone
 Robert Weingartner, A tribute to Brian Jones
 Terry Rawlings (1994), Who Killed Christopher Robin?: The Life and Death of Brian Jones, 
 R. Chapman, "The bittersweet symphony", Mojo, 68 (July 1999), pg.62–84
 Alan Clayson, Brian Jones, 
 Mandy Aftel, Death of a Rolling Stone: The Brian Jones Story (Delilah Books, 1982) 
 Graham Ride, Foundation Stone,

External links

 

1942 births
1969 deaths
Alcohol-related deaths in England
British harmonica players
British rhythm and blues boom musicians
Burials in Gloucestershire
Death conspiracy theories
Deaths by drowning in the United Kingdom
Drug-related deaths in England
Accidental deaths in England
English blues guitarists
English male guitarists
English buskers
English multi-instrumentalists
English people of Welsh descent
English rock guitarists
English rock keyboardists
Lead guitarists
Musicians from Gloucestershire
People educated at Dean Close School
People educated at Pate's Grammar School
People from Cheltenham
Rhythm guitarists
Sitar players
Slide guitarists
The Rolling Stones members
20th-century English musicians
English songwriters
English male composers
20th-century British guitarists
Rock oboists
English oboists
20th-century British male musicians
British autoharp players